Néma Airport  is an airport serving Néma, a city in the Hodh Ech Chargui region of southeastern Mauritania.

Airlines and destinations

References

External links
 

Airports in Mauritania
Hodh Ech Chargui Region